The University of Montenegro Music Academy (Montenegrin: Muzička Akademija Univerziteta Crne Gore Музичка Академија Универзитета Црне Горе) is one of the educational institutions of the University of Montenegro. The Academy is located in Cetinje, in the building of the former British embassy to Montenegro.

History 

The Music Academy was founded in 1980, as part of the "Veljko Vlahović" University (today's University of Montenegro). The Academy was located in Podgorica until 1996, when it was moved to the building of the former Embassy of the United Kingdom in Cetinje.

In November 2006, the Academy became a full member of the European Association of Conservatoires (AEC).

Organization 

Undergraduate studies, as well as postgraduate specialist and master studies are offered on the following eight study groups:
 Composing
 Conducting
 General Music Pedagogy
 Piano
 String Instruments 
 Violin
 Viola
 Violoncello
 Contrabass
 Wind Instruments 
 Flute
 Clarinet
 Trumpet
 Horn
 Trombone
 Oboe
 Guitar
 Accordion

References 

Music
Music
Montenegro
Music schools in Montenegro
1980 establishments in Yugoslavia